Not So Bad as We Seem, Or, Many Sides to a Character: A Comedy in Five Acts, was a play written by Sir Edward Bulwer-Lytton in 1851, and performed the same year as a charity event to benefit the Literary Guild, a society for struggling authors. The performance was especially notable for its cast, which included novelists Charles Dickens and Wilkie Collins, Punch editor Mark Lemon, artists Augustus Egg and John Tenniel, and writers Peter Cunningham and Douglas Jerrold. Dickens and Collins met for the first time during production.

The performance was attended by Queen Victoria, who thought it "full of cleverness, though rather too long."

References

External links 
 Full text at Google Books
 Full text at Archive.org
 Original playbill, in color

Plays by Edward Bulwer-Lytton
1851 plays